Actinorectispora indica is a Gram-positive and aerobic bacterium from the genus of Actinorectispora which has been isolated from soil from Kurnool in India.

References

Actinomycetales
Bacteria described in 2016